The Americas Zone was one of three zones of regional competition in the 2007 Fed Cup.

Group I
Venue: Pilara Tenis Club, Buenos Aires, Argentina (outdoor clay) 
Date: 18–21 April

The seven teams were divided into one pool of three teams and one pool of four. The top team of each pool played-off against each other to decide which two nations progress to the World Group II Play-offs. The four nations coming third in each pool then played-off to determine which team would join the fourth-placed team from the four-team pool in being relegated down to Group II for 2008.

Pools

Play-offs

  advanced to 2007 World Group II Play-offs.

Group II
Venue: Carrasco Lawn Tennis Club, Montevideo, Uruguay (outdoor clay) 
Date: 16–21 April

The nine teams were divided into one pool of four teams and one pool of five. The top two teams of each pool played-off against each other to decide which two nations progress to the Group I.

Pools

Play-offs

  and  advanced to Group I for 2008.

See also
Fed Cup structure

References

 Fed Cup Profile, Mexico
 Fed Cup Profile, Chile
 Fed Cup Profile, Argentina
 Fed Cup Profile, Puerto Rico
 Fed Cup Profile, Dominican Republic
 Fed Cup Profile, Uruguay
 Fed Cup Profile, Honduras
 Fed Cup Profile, Bermuda
 Fed Cup Profile, Guatemala
 Fed Cup Profile, Barbados
 Fed Cup Profile, Paraguay
 Fed Cup Profile, Bolivia

External links
 Fed Cup website

 
Americas
International sports competitions in Buenos Aires
Tennis tournaments in Argentina
Sports competitions in Montevideo
Tennis tournaments in Uruguay
2007 in Uruguayan tennis
International sports competitions hosted by Uruguay
Women's sports competitions in Uruguay